Cercosaura parkeri, known commonly as Parker's many-fingered teiid , is a species of lizard in the family Gymnophthalmidae. The species is endemic to South America.

Etymology
The specific name, parkeri, is in honor of English herpetologist Hampton Wildman Parker.

Geographic range
C. parkeri is found in Argentina, Bolivia, Brazil, and Peru.

Reproduction
C. parkeri is oviparous.

References

Further reading
Bernarde, Paulo Sérgio; Mota da Silva, Ageane; Recoder, Renato (2016). "Predation on the lizard Pantodactylus parkeri Ruibal, 1952 (Squamata: Gymnophthalmidae) by Guira guira (Aves, Cuculidae) in the Pantanal at Pocone, Western Brazil". Herpetology Notes 9: 279–281.
Doan, Tiffany M. (2003). "A new phylogenetic classification for the gymnophthalmid genera Cercosaura, Pantodactylus and Prionodactylus (Reptilia: Squamata)". Zoological Journal of the Linnean Society 137 (1): 101–115. (Cercosaura parkeri, new combination).
Ruibal, Rodolfo (1952). "Revisionary Studies of Some South American Teiidae". Bulletin of the Museum of Comparative Zoölogy at Harvard College 106 (11): 475–529. (Pantodactylus schreibersii parkeri, new subspecies, pp. 518–520).
Tedesco ME, Cei JM (1999). "Remarks on the Taxonomic status of the Argentine subspecies of Pantodactylus schreibersii (Wiegmann, 1834) (Gymnophthalmidae, Scleroglossa, Squamata)". Bollettino del Museo Regionale di Scienze Naturali, Torino 16: 309–320. (Pantodactylus parkeri, new status).

Cercosaura
Reptiles described in 1952
Taxa named by Rodolfo Ruibal